Harold Jacoby (4 March 1865 – 20 July 1932) was an American astronomer, born in New York City.

Career overview
Jacoby received his B.A. from Columbia College in 1885 and his Ph.D. from Columbia in 1895. He applied himself to astronomical research, and was appointed assistant astronomer for the United States eclipse expedition to West Africa (1889–90).

He became professor of astronomy at Columbia University in 1894, and chaired the department until shortly before his death. Columbia's Rutherfurd Observatory was started during his tenure, with a twelve-inch Clarke refractor telescope and a transit instrument emplaced atop Pupin Hall.

Jacoby made many observations of celestial events such as lunar and solar eclipses. He was well known in Europe and America, and was a member of a large number of scientific groups. He published Practical Talks by an Astronomer (1891, 1902), Astronomy: A Popular Handbook (1913) and Navigation (1917).

Notes

References

External links

 
 
 
 
 Charles Augustus Young; George C. Comstock; Robert S. Ball, Camille Flammarion; Harold Jacoby. Five weeks' study of astronomy. 1901 

1865 births
1932 deaths
American astronomers
Columbia College (New York) alumni
Columbia Graduate School of Arts and Sciences alumni
Columbia University faculty